The SS Ajax was a Danish cargo ship that was torpedoed by  in the Bay of Biscay off Audierne, France, while she was travelling from Bilbao, Spain, to Cardiff, Wales, United Kingdom.

Construction 
SS Ajax was constructed in 1889 with yard no. 32 at the W. Dobson & Co. shipyard in Newcastle, United Kingdom. She was launched on 30 October 1889 and completed in December. She sailed under the name SS Antiquary under the British flag until she was sold in 1901 to Torm Dampskibselsskabet in Copenhagen, Denmark.

She had a triple expansion steam engine driving a single screw propeller. The engine was rated at 111 nhp.

Sinking 
On 25 December 1917, Ajax was on a voyage in a convoy from Bilbao, Spain, to Cardiff, Wales. The torpedo struck in the engine room which made the boilers explode a few seconds later and sent the ship to the bottom of the Bay in just 30 seconds. The survivors reached land in a badly damaged life boat. At the time of her sinking the Ajax was carrying a cargo of iron ore.

Wreck 

References

1889 ships
World War I merchant ships of Denmark
Merchant ships of the United Kingdom
Ships built on the River Tyne
Maritime incidents in 1917
Ships sunk by German submarines in World War I
World War I shipwrecks in the Atlantic Ocean
Steamships of Denmark